Ab Garmak-e Olya (also romanized as Āb Garmak-e ‘Olyā; also known as Āb Garmak-e Bālā) is a village in Sardarabad Rural District, in the Central District of Shushtar County, Khuzestan Province, Iran. At the 2006 census, its population was 920, in 180 families.

References 

Populated places in Shushtar County